James Thomas Franklin was an Australian politician. He was a member of the Western Australian Legislative Council representing the Metropolitan and Suburban Provinces from his election on 22 May 1928 until the end of his term in 1940. Franklin was a member of the Liberal Party until 1917, then joined the National Party.

References 

Members of the Western Australian Legislative Council
20th-century Australian politicians